Wuqing District is a district of Tianjin, bordering Hebei province to the north and west, Beijing Municipality to the northwest, Baodi District to the northeast, and Beichen District and Xiqing District to the southeast/south.

Administrative divisions
There are 6 subdistricts, 19 towns, and 5 townships in the district:

Climate

References

External links

Districts of Tianjin